"C'est la Vie (Always 21)" is the first new single released from Ace of Base's first greatest hits album, Singles of the 90s. It was produced by Jimmy James Ekgren, Sonny Peterson and Sigurd Rosnes of JPR Productions.  It was released in Europe on 25 October 1999.  A planned UK release with additional remixes for 6 December was cancelled, but the remixes were finally released commercially in 2020 as part of the boxset All That She Wants: The Classic Collection.  A music video was produced to promote the single. The video was directed by Patric Ullaeus.

Critical reception
AllMusic editor Bryan Buss described the song as "young-at-heart" in his review of the band's Greatest Hits album. Swedish newspaper Expressen wrote that it "sounds as if Ace Of Base has gone into childhood again". They added that "the group's charm comes out best" on a song like "C'est la Vie (Always 21)".

Track listing
Scandinavia/Germany maxi single
 Radio Version - 3:26
 Megamix (Short Version) - 3:24 
 Cecilia (Ole Evenrude Version) - 4:35
 Megamix (Long Version) - 7:19
 Discomatic Remix - 3:56

UK maxi single (unreleased)
 Radio Edit - 3:29
 Megamix (Long Version) - 7:19 
 All That She Wants (12" Version) - 6:46

Official versions/remixes
Album Version
Discomatic Remix (also simply titled "Remix" on some releases)
Shaft Radio Edit
Shaft Club Mix
Skeewiff's Full Bitter
Sleaze Sisters Anthem
Tuff Twins Mix

Release history

Charts

References

1999 singles
Ace of Base songs
1999 songs
Songs written by Jonas Berggren
Number-one singles in Spain
Mega Records singles